Akwetey Mensah (born April 15, 1983) is a Ghanaian footballer who plays as a defensive midfielder for Al-Sinaat Al-Kahrabaiya in the Iraqi Premier League.

Career 
He transferred to El-Ahly in the 2005–2004 season from El-Masry for a speculated record fee for the Egyptian League back at the time. In his debut match, which happened to be in the opening match of the group phase of the African Champions League against Enyimba in Nigeria, Akwetey suffered a tear in his knee ligaments without being touched by any player, only 6 minutes into the game and this kept him out of action for the rest of the season. In the next season, he played some games and came in as a sub. He only started in two or three games and couldn't get the attention of the Coach Manuel José as he didn't get back in form. He was linked with a possible transfer back to El-Masry as of January 2007 and with Al Ahli Dubai.
In 2009, he signed for the Belgian Club Lierse S.K. On 27 May 2009, it was announced that he had joined Belgian club Lierse.

Honours
Al Ahly SC
CAF Champions League: 2005, 2006
CAF Super Cup: 2006, 2007
Egyptian Premier League: 2005-06
Egypt Cup: 2005–06, 2006–07
Egyptian Super Cup: 2005, 2006
FIFA Club World Cup Bronze medal: 2006

Lierse SK
Belgian Second Division: 2009-10

Wadi Degla
Egypt Cup runner-up: 2013

Al-Quwa Al-Jawiya
 Iraq FA Cup: 2015–16

References

1983 births
Living people
Ghanaian footballers
Al Masry SC players
Ghanaian expatriate sportspeople in Belgium
Association football central defenders
Ghanaian expatriate sportspeople in Egypt
Ghanaian expatriates in Iraq
Ittihad El Shorta SC players
Expatriate footballers in Iraq
Al-Quwa Al-Jawiya players
Al-Mina'a SC players
Al-Shorta SC players